This is a list of both the National roads and the provincial roads in Madagascar. Many are unpaved dirt roads, or insufficiently maintained.

National roads

Route Provinciale (Provincial roads)

Toll roads 

 Antananarivo–Toamasina toll highway

See also
Driving in Madagascar

References
  PLAN NATIONAL DETRANSPORT (2004-2020) 
  Routes Nationales
 Atlas mondiale, France Loisir, Paris, pages 158/159
 Le réseau routier dans la Région Melaky
 Normes contre Inondations

Roads in Madagascar
Madagascar
Roads
Roads